Rafael Cabello de Alba y Gracia (31 August 1925 – 4 May 2010) was a Spanish politician who served as Minister of Finance and Second Deputy Prime Minister of Spain between 1974 and 1975, during the Francoist dictatorship.

References

1925 births
2010 deaths
Economy and finance ministers of Spain
Deputy Prime Ministers of Spain
Government ministers during the Francoist dictatorship
People from Campiña Sur (Córdoba)
Politicians from Andalusia